The 1923 Coupe de France Final was a football match held at Stade Pershing, Paris on May 6, 1923, that saw Red Star Olympique defeat FC Sète 4–2 thanks to goals by Marcel Naudin (2), Lucien Cordon and Robert Joyaut.

Match details

See also
Coupe de France 1922-1923

External links
Coupe de France results at Rec.Sport.Soccer Statistics Foundation
Report on French federation site

Coupe De France Final
1923
Coupe De France Final 1923
Coupe De France Final 1923
Coupe de France Final
Coupe de France Final